Fountas is a Greek surname. Notable people with the surname include:
Giorgos Fountas (1924–2010), Greek actor
Irene Fountas (born 1948), American educational theorist
Taxiarchis Fountas (born 1995), Greek footballer

Greek-language surnames